The 1961 Soviet Chess Championship - 29th edition was held from 16 November to 20 December 1961 in Baku. The tournament was won by Boris Spassky. The final were preceded by semifinals events at Batumi, Novgorod and Kiev. 1961 was the year of two Soviet Chess Championships, the 28th  and the 29th editions.

Table and results

References 

USSR Chess Championships
Championship
Chess
1961 in chess
Chess